Elizabeth Jean Elphinstone Pirie  (14 September 1932 – 1 March 2005) was a British numismatist specialising in ninth-century Northumbrian coinage, and museum curator, latterly as Keeper of Archaeology at Leeds City Museum from 1960–91. She wrote eight books and dozens of articles throughout her career. She was a fellow of the Royal Numismatic Society, president of the Yorkshire Numismatic Society and a fellow of the Society of Antiquaries of London.

Early life
Pirie was born in Malta on 14 September 1932, whilst her father was serving there as a Royal Naval Chaplain. She returned to Britain with her mother, shortly before the outbreak of the Second World War. Until her father's retirement in 1953, the family moved several times, and Pirie attended 8 schools. After an MA degree at University of Edinburgh and an archaeology diploma at Cambridge, in 1952 she started work on several archaeological excavations. This worked continued until 1955, when she took up a post at Grosvenor Museum, Chester.

Career
Pirie was appointed Assistant Curator at the Grosvenor Museum in 1955. Here she was responsible for the display in 1956 of Dr Willoughby Gardner's collection of coins from the Chester mint (facility). In March 1957 she moved to Maidstone Museum as Archaeological Assistant. In 1960 she became Keeper of Archaeology at Leeds City Museum, a post she held until her retirement in 1991. Most of her books and articles were written during this time. During her time at Leeds she led several excavations, including the Cistercian ware kiln at Potterton, near in Barwick-in-Elmet with Philip Mayes.

Pirie became the foremost expert on styca coinage and her volume Coins of the Kingdom of Northumbria "provides an indispensable illustrated corpus of the known material".

Later life
Pirie retired to Edinburgh in 1991 and bought a flat in Marchmont. She was active in her local church, continued her research and campaigned on local issues. She died on 1 March 2005 and her cremation was held on 11 March at Mortonhall Crematorium.

Honours
Fellow of the Royal Numismatic Society, 1957
Vice-President of the Yorkshire Numismatic Society & BANS Delegate, 1968
President of the Yorkshire Numismatic Society, 1970
Fellow of the Society of Antiquaries of London, 1978

Publications

Books

Articles
'A Coin Certainly of Leicester but with a mint signature of Chester', with R H M Dolley, Numismatic Circular 70.9
'The Repurcussions on Chester's Prosperity of the Viking Descent on Cheshire in 980', with R H M Dolley, British Numismatic Journal 33
'Coins of the Chester Mint', Transactions of the Yorkshire Numismatic Society 2
'A Further Note on Coins from the Bishophill (York) find of 1882', Annual Report of the Yorkshire Philosophical Society (1971)
'Early Norman Coins in the Yorkshire Museum', Annual Report of the Yorkshire Philosophical Society (1972)
'Numismatics and Conservation: a numismatic view', Museums Journal 79.1
'Early Northumbrian coins at auction, 1981', British Numismatic Journal 51
'Coins', in P Mayes & L Butler, Sandal Castle Excavations 1964–73
' The Ripon Hoard, 1695: Contemporary and Current Interest', British Numismatic Journal 52
'Eanred's Penny: a Northumbrian enigma', The Yorkshire Numismatist 3
'The Bamburgh Hoard of Ninth-Century Northumbrian Coins', Archaeologia Aeliana 33

See also 

 Hexham Hoard
St Leonard's Place Hoard
 Styca
Leeds Museums & Galleries

References 

1932 births
2005 deaths
British numismatists
British women curators
Alumni of the University of Edinburgh
Fellows of the Society of Antiquaries of London
British curators
Women numismatists
British women archaeologists
British archaeologists
20th-century archaeologists